Aliabad-e Kharabeh (also Romanized as ‘Alīābād-e Kharābeh; also known as ‘Alīābād) is a village in Karimabad Rural District, Sharifabad District, Pakdasht County, Tehran Province, Iran. At the 2006 census, its population was 50, in 12 families.

References 

Populated places in Pakdasht County